The Estrup cabinet was the government of Denmark from 7 August 1894 to 23 May 1897. It replaced the Estrup cabinet and was succeeded by the Hørring cabinet on 23 May 1897.

List of ministers and portfolios
Some of the terms in the table begin before 7 August 1894 or end after 23 May 1897 because the minister was in the Estrup cabinet or the Hørring cabinet as well.

References

1894 establishments in Denmark
1897 disestablishments
Reedtz-Thott